The Supreme Court of the United States handed down ten per curiam opinions during its 2019 term, which began October 7, 2019 and concluded October 4, 2020.

Because per curiam decisions are issued from the Court as an institution, these opinions all lack the attribution of authorship or joining votes to specific justices. All justices on the Court at the time the decision was handed down are assumed to have participated and concurred unless otherwise noted.

Court membership

Chief Justice: John Roberts

Associate Justices: Clarence Thomas, Ruth Bader Ginsburg (died September 18, 2020), Stephen Breyer, Samuel Alito, Sonia Sotomayor, Elena Kagan, Neil Gorsuch, Brett Kavanaugh

Thompson v. Hebdon

Retirement Plans Comm. of IBM v. Jander

Roman Catholic Archdiocese of San Juan v. Acevedo Feliciano

Davis v. United States

Republican National Committee v. Democratic National Committee

New York State Rifle & Pistol Association, Inc. v. City of New York

Andrus v. Texas

Barr v. Lee

See also 
 List of United States Supreme Court cases, volume 589
 List of United States Supreme Court cases, volume 590
 List of United States Supreme Court cases, volume 591

Notes

References

 

United States Supreme Court per curiam opinions
Lists of 2019 term United States Supreme Court opinions
2019 per curiam